Mountain is an unincorporated census-designated place in Oconto County, Wisconsin, United States. The community is located at the intersection of Wisconsin Highway 32 and Wisconsin Highway 64, in the town of Mountain. It is located at latitude 45.185 and longitude -88.474 and elevation 971 feet (mean sea level). The postal code for Mountain is 54149. As of the 2010 census, its population is 363.

History
A post office called Mountain has been in operation since 1889. Mountain was platted in 1896. The community was named from the hilly terrain in the area, which early drivers compared to climbing mountains.

Images

Notes

Census-designated places in Oconto County, Wisconsin
Census-designated places in Wisconsin